Teleios, also known as Beyond the Trek, is an American science-fiction film written and directed by Ian Truitner. The film stars Sunny Mabrey, Lance Broadway, Michael Nouri, T.J. Hoban, Mykel Shannon Jenkins, Christian Pitre, Ursula Mills and Weetus Cren, and was edited by Gabriella Cristiani.

Plot 
For two years, a deep space mining vessel has been drifting off Saturn’s moon, Titan. The crew may have killed each other but their fate is unknown. In an attempt to investigate, a rescue vessel with a crew of genetically modified advanced humans is sent on the deep space explorer “Teleios” to discover if there are any survivors and to find out what happened. Little do they realise that what they are about to discover may threaten to destroy themselves and the whole of humanity.

Cast 

Sunny Mabrey as Iris Duncan
Lance Broadway as Commander Linden
Michael Nouri as Nordham
T.J. Hoban as Chris Zimmer
Mykel Shannon Jenkins as Doctor Orson
Christian Pitre as Emma Anderson
Ursula Mills as Lulu AH-320
Weetus Cren as Travis O’Neill
John Posey as Atromitos Captain
Leila Birch as Computer Voice
Armando DuBon Jr. as Crewman Ramirez
Andreas Lyon as Crewman Vanderveld
Phillip Tan as Crewman Dang

Release 
The film had its world premiere at Sci-Fi-London and U.S. premiere at Shriekfest. The film has won several awards, including Best Science Fiction Feature at The New York Science Fiction Film Festival, Best Director at the American Movie Awards and Best Special FX at the Maverick Movie Awards.

The film was renamed "Beyond the Trek" and distributed in North America through Screen Media Films. The release title of Teleios has changed in different countries. It's known as "Deep Space" in the U.K., "Teleios - Endlose Angst" in Germany, "Beyond the Trek" in Japan, and by its original title, "Teleios", in Australia.

Response 

The Austin Chronicle said, "Truitner's story of social strata, and the terrifying potential of gene tampering, has found a new timeliness.". First Comics News gave it 4 out of 5 stars, saying "For the start, the show is low key. Things do really start getting interesting as the show takes some unexpected twists and turns." Film Threat gave the film a 6 out of 10, stating "Visually, the movie rocks. This is an indie effort worthy of note that fails to tick a few boxes, but still deserves perhaps a “B” for effort."

References

External links 

 
 

2017 films
American science fiction films
American independent films
2017 science fiction films
American space opera films
2017 independent films
2010s English-language films
2010s American films